The Meridian Centre is a 5,300 seat arena in downtown St. Catharines, Ontario, Canada, located at 1 David S. Howes Way. The arena is the home of the Niagara IceDogs of the Ontario Hockey League and the Niagara River Lions of the Canadian Elite Basketball League.

History
In December 2011, after years of debate, St. Catharines City Council voted 9–3 to approve the construction of a multi-use spectator facility with 4,500 to 5,300 seats, at a maximum cost of $50 million. The project was to be funded with $17 million from the civic project fund, $5 million in fundraising, $1 million from the federal gas tax fund.

In October 2012, city councillors voted 11–2 to pay $45 million to Ball-Rankin Construction to build a new 4,500-seat facility, to be completed by September 2014. Ball-Rankin donated a pair of 25-metre elevated walkways to connect the centre to the city's downtown area on St. Paul Street, at a cost of $2 million.

Naming rights
Meridian Credit Union was given the naming rights of the facility in recognition of its $5.23 million contribution to the project. The name of the arena was announced in September 2013.

St. Catharines Sports Hall of Fame
The St. Catharines Sports Hall of Fame was founded in 1990 to recognize the outstanding accomplishments of both women and men, athletes and builders whom have significantly contributed to the development of sport in St. Catharines and went on to success at Provincial, National and/or International levels of competition. Upon completion of the Meridian Centre, the St. Catharines Sports Hall of Fame was relocated to concourse level of the arena.

Arena information
The arena offers four main concession stands as well as multiple food carts and seat vendors. The IceDogs also run a retail store inside the Meridian Centre. The arena offers basic concession fare but also has other menu items not typically found including jalapeño sausages, macaroni and cheese and fresh salads. Beer including craft beers and local wines can be found throughout the concourse. The arena also has the IceDogs store which is the main retail store for the IceDogs and sells all fan gear.

Sports
The primary tenant at the Meridian Centre is the Niagara IceDogs of the Ontario Hockey League. The Niagara IceDogs won their first game at the Meridian Centre on October 16, 2014, against the Belleville Bulls by a score of 7–4 in front of a sellout crowd of 5,300, the largest attendance in franchise history. This record was later broken when standing room tickets were sold during the 2015–16 playoffs with an attendance of 5,580.

In 2015, the Meridian Centre welcomed a secondary tenant in the Niagara River Lions of the National Basketball League of Canada. The addition of the River Lions basketball court also allows for important Brock University men's and women's basketball games to be relocated to the larger venue of the Meridian Centre. The River Lions joined the Canadian Elite Basketball League in 2018.

The Meridian Centre hosted the 2016 IIHF World Women's U18 Championship in January 2016. The final, a 3–2 overtime victory for the United States over Canada, resulted in the largest hockey crowd in arena history at 5,516. Overall, the total tournament attendance of 34,523 surpassed the previous record of 16,855.

On September 29, 2016, the Meridian Centre hosted a pre-season exhibition game between the Toronto Maple Leafs and the Buffalo Sabres of the National Hockey League. After regulation and overtime, the game remained scoreless. Matt Moulson would ultimately give the Sabres the 1-0 shoot-out win.

The Meridian Centre hosted the 2017 Scotties Tournament of Hearts, the annual Canadian women's curling championship, between February 16 and 26, 2017. Team Ontario, led by Rachel Homan, defeated Team Manitoba in the final by a score of 8–6. The overall attendance throughout the tournament was 56, 804.

In June 2018, the Meridian Centre hosted the 2018 FIBA Under-18 Americas Championship.

In 2020, St Catharines and the Meridian Centre hosted the 2020 CEBL Bubble. The tournament took place at the venue with teams quarantining at city hotels. The Edmonton Stingers were named the champions at the end of the tournament.In 2021 Meridian Centre hosted 3 UFC events.

Concerts and other events
On October 21, 2014, St. Catharines' native band City and Colour performed as the headline act for the centre's grand opening. The arena has also hosted such acts as John Mellencamp, The Tragically Hip, Chris De Burgh, Blue Rodeo, Tim Hicks, Old Dominion, Elton John, Daniel O' Donnell, Metric, Johnny Reid, Hedley and Death Cab For Cutie.

They have also played host to Harlem Globetrotters basketball games, WWE NXT and Cirque du Soleil. Comedians such as Jeff Dunham and Jerry Seinfeld have also performed shows at the venue. Other guests who have made appearances include Theresa Caputo. The center has also held numerous cheerleading competitions, expos and skating shows.

The opening ceremony of the 2022 Canada Summer Games was held at the Meridian Centre on August 6, 2022.

Gallery

See also 
 Scotiabank Convention Centre – convention centre located in Niagara Falls

References

External links
 Meridian Centre

Indoor arenas in Ontario
Indoor ice hockey venues in Canada
Ontario Hockey League arenas
Sports venues in St. Catharines
Music venues in Ontario
2014 establishments in Ontario
Meridian Credit Union